Anthony Zingg (born 17 October 1993) is a German judoka.

He is the bronze medallist of the 2019 Judo Grand Slam Brasilia in the -73 kg category.

References

External links
 

1993 births
Living people
German male judoka
European Games competitors for Germany
Judoka at the 2019 European Games